Borzysław I (died probably on 30 June 1317) was the Archbishop of Gniezno from 1316 to 1317.
Neither the date nor place of his birth are known and little is known about his origins, career or his short Episcopacy.

In 1314 the chapter of the cathedral of Gniezno elected Borzysław as Archbishop, so he went to Avignon for Pope Clement V to confirmed the choice. However, Clement V died, and it took two years to determine his successor, Pope John XXII. In 1317 Borzysław again returned to Avignon where his selection was confirmed and consecrated by John XXII. However, while awaiting clearance Borzysław himself suddenly died.

References

External links
 Virtual tour Gniezno Cathedral  

Archbishops of Gniezno
1317 deaths
13th-century births